Sławomir Twardygrosz  (born 18 April 1967 in Gorzów Wielkopolski) is a retired Polish professional footballer who played for Śląsk Wrocław and Lech Poznań in the Polish Ekstraklasa.

Club career
Twardygrosz began his professional career with Śląsk Wrocław, and played in 121 Ekstraklasa league matches and 28 Second League matches over five seasons. With nine league goals, he is one of the all-time leading scorers for Śląsk Wrocław.

Twardygrosz moved to Lech Poznań for the 1994-95 season, where he made 33 Ekstraklasa league appearances in the next 1.5 seasons. He spent a few seasons in the lower leagues before returning to Lech where he appeared in another 10 second division matches before his retirement.

References

1967 births
Living people
Polish footballers
Śląsk Wrocław players
Lech Poznań players
Sportspeople from Gorzów Wielkopolski
Association football defenders